Sonora is a city in and the county seat of Sutton County, Texas, United States.  The population was 3,027 at the 2010 census.

Geography and climate

Sonora is located at  (30.568166, –100.644163).

According to the United States Census Bureau, the city has a total area of 2.0 square miles (5.1 km), all of it land.

The area lies in the western portions of the Texas Hill Country, a region of limestone outcrops and rolling terrain dotted with areas of live oaks (Quercus fusiformis) and juniper (Juniperus ashei) in the form of a woodland or savanna, alternating with a blend of various grasses and other shrubs and cacti.

Sonora's climate is subhumid and subtropical, though periods of long drought are not uncommon due to the proximity of deserts and steppes nearby, to the west. The upland location allows some of the periodic Gulf of Mexico moisture to interact with frontal systems and elevated terrain to create more clouds and precipitation than locations in the brush country to the south, or the steppes and deserts to the west and northwest. Thunderstorms with heavy rainfall are most frequent during spring and fall months, though some lighter, steady precipitation and low clouds can occur during the winter, due in large part to frontal systems originating on the plains and prairies to the north.

Summers are long and hot, often with higher humidity, though a good breeze often moderates the heat. Fall through spring months are often pleasant, though winter can experience brief periods of cold or cloudy weather.

Demographics

2020 census

As of the 2020 United States census, there were 2,502 people, 1,085 households, and 799 families residing in the city.

2000 census
As of the census of 2000, 2,924 people, 1,043 households, and 808 families resided in the city. The population density was 1,488.8 people per square mile (576.0/km). There were 1,264 housing units at an average density of 643.6 per square mile (249.0/km). The racial makeup of the city was 74.18% White, 0.34% African American, 0.34% Native American, 0.24% Asian, 23.36% from other races, and 1.54% from two or more races. Hispanics or Latinos of any race were 53.35% of the population.

Of the 1,043 households, 42.9% had children under the age of 18 living with them, 64.0% were married couples living together, 8.5% had a female householder with no husband present, and 22.5% were not families. About 20.6% of all households were made up of individuals, and 8.5% had someone living alone who was 65 years of age or older. The average household size was 2.77 and the average family size was 3.23.

In the city, the population was distributed as 31.1% under the age of 18, 7.4% from 18 to 24, 28.7% from 25 to 44, 22.2% from 45 to 64, and 10.7% who were 65 years of age or older. The median age was 34 years. For every 100 females, there were 98.8 males. For every 100 females age 18 and over, there were 95.2 males.

The median income for a household in the city was $36,272, and for a family was $38,106. Males had a median income of $31,728 versus $17,935 for females. The per capita income for the city was $16,128. About 13.0% of families and 16.7% of the population were below the poverty line, including 23.9% of those under age 18 and 11.2% of those age 65 or over.

Local government

The city government of Sonora uses the aldermanic form of government. It is led by an elected mayor and four other council members.

As of February 24, 2016 the mayor of Sonora was Wanda Shurley and the four council members were Doug Chandler, Todd Munn, Jeremy Dawson, and Terri Johnson.
The Sonora police department is headed by Chief Matthew Routh.

Education
The City of Sonora is served by the Sonora Independent School District. Sonora exhibits a proud tradition of both academic and athletic success in its long history. The Sonora High School Broncos have won the most football state championships in their division (2A) with five, the most recent having been won in 2000 against the Blanco Panthers.

The latest championship team was coached by Jason Herring. 2000 was the first of two State Championships for him, his second coming in 2011 (beating the Broncos on the way there) with the Refugio Bobcats.

History
On the night of April 2, 1901, William Carver, a member of Butch Cassidy's Wild Bunch, was shot and killed in Jack Owen's Bakery by Sheriff E.S. Briant and his deputies. Briant was trying to arrest Carver on suspicion of the murder of Oliver Thornton in Concho County.

Notable people

 Dan Blocker, who portrayed "Hoss" on Bonanza, was a high-school English and drama teacher in Sonora before he was cast in the NBC western television series
 Bill Ratliff, Former State Senator and Lieutenant Governor of Mount Pleasant was reared in Sonora and graduated from high school there
 Jack Taylor, a mayor of Mesa, Arizona, who served in both houses of the Arizona State Legislature, was born in Sonora in 1907

Attractions
 Caverns of Sonora: about 8 miles to the west
 Eaton Hill Nature Center: interpretive exhibits and over 3 miles of hiking trails.
 Miers House Museum: restored 1890s Victorian home.
 Old Sonora Ice House Ranch Museum, a museum focused on the legacy of Will Carver.

References

External links

 City of Sonora website

Cities in Sutton County, Texas
Cities in Texas
County seats in Texas